New Era Academy is a public secondary school serving grades 9 to 12, located in the Cherry Hill neighborhood of South Baltimore, Maryland, United States. It was operated as an "innovation high school" by Replications, Inc. for the Baltimore City Public School System.

The school opened in 2003, serving students citywide.

References

Cherry Hill, Baltimore
Public schools in Baltimore
Public high schools in Maryland
Public middle schools in Maryland
Charter schools in Maryland